Ludwik Janusz Peretz (9 January 1923 – 1 December 2022) was a Polish-born French architect.

Biography
Peretz began his university studies at the Warsaw University of Technology and served in the Home Army. He was a prisoner of war from 1944 to 1945. In 1966, he became a naturalized French citizen. He worked as an architect in Roubaix and Lille, primarily working on construction of churches.

Peretz died in Villeneuve-d'Ascq on 1 December 2022, at the age of 99.

Main constructions
École des beaux-arts (Lille, 1959–1964)
Église du Saint-Curé-d'Ars (Lille, 1960)
Église Notre-Dame-de-la-Nativité (Villeneuve-d'Ascq, 1963)
Chapelle Notre-Dame-de-la-Nativité (Armentières, 1964)
Chapelle Saint-Pierre (Lomme, 1964)
Église Saint-Joseph (Grande-Synthe, 1965)
Chapelle Saint-Paul (Saint-André-lez-Lille, 1965)
Église Sainte-Bernadette (Rosendaël, 1966)
Maison Monniez (Villeneuve-d'Ascq, 1972)
Maison Derville (Villeneuve-d'Ascq, 1973)
Immeuble (Lille, 1975)
Maison Camus (Villeneuve-d'Ascq, 1976)
Maison Wallez (Mouvaux, 1979)
Chapelle dite Centre Romero (Villeneuve-d'Ascq, 1980)

References

1923 births
2022 deaths
20th-century French architects
Home Army members
Polish emigrants to France
Warsaw University of Technology alumni
People from Warsaw